Romanescu is a surname. Notable people with the surname include:

 Elena Alistar-Romanescu
 Marcel Romanescu
 
 Nicolae Romanescu Park

See also 
 Romanesco broccoli
 Romanesco dialect

Romanian-language surnames